In mathematics, a cubical complex (also called cubical set and Cartesian complex) is a set composed of points, line segments, squares, cubes, and their n-dimensional counterparts. They are used analogously to simplicial complexes and CW complexes in the computation of the homology of topological spaces.

Definitions 

An elementary interval is a subset  of the form

 

An elementary cube  is the finite product of elementary intervals, i.e.

 

where  are elementary intervals. A set  is a cubical complex (or cubical set) if it can be written as a union of elementary cubes (or possibly, is homeomorphic to such a set).

Related terminology 
Elementary intervals of length 0 (containing a single point) are called degenerate, while those of length 1 are nondegenerate.

Algebraic topology 

In algebraic topology, cubical complexes are often useful for concrete calculations. In particular, there is a definition of homology for cubical complexes that coincides with the singular homology, but is computable.

See also 

 Simplicial complex
 Simplicial homology
 Abstract cell complex

References 

Cubes
Topological spaces
Algebraic topology
Computational topology